The 134th (48th Highlanders) Battalion, CEF was a unit in the Canadian Expeditionary Force during the Great War.  Based in Toronto, Ontario, the unit began recruiting in late 1915 in that city.  After sailing to England in August 1916, the battalion was absorbed into the 12th Reserve Battalion on March 7, 1918.  The 134th (48th Highlanders) Battalion, CEF had one Officer Commanding: Lieut-Col. A. A. Miller.

The 134th Battalion is perpetuated by the 48th Highlanders of Canada.

See also
Percy LeSueur

References

Meek, John F. Over the Top! The Canadian Infantry in the First World War. Orangeville, Ont.: The Author, 1971.

Battalions of the Canadian Expeditionary Force
Military units and formations established in 1915
Military units and formations disestablished in 1918
1915 establishments in Ontario
1918 disestablishments in Ontario
48th Highlanders of Canada